TOROS artillery rocket system (lit. "Gunner") is a Turkish rocket artillery multiple rocket launcher system that has been developed in both 230 and 260 mm calibre. The system was developed by TÜBİTAK-SAGE, and is used by the Turkish Army. It is developed by the Turkish Defense Industry.

Description

This system is in general copy of Military Technical Institute Belgrade M-87 Orkan with some minor modification in rocket design, different fuel for rocket and tubes. It is developed through reverse engineering and plans obtained for Orkan M-87 including launcher M-87 and rocket 262mm used in that process all obtained from BNT Bratstvo Novi Travnik from Bosnia and Herzegovina. Sage is also known for reverse engendering of M270 Multiple Launch Rocket System 227mm rocket under designation SAGE 227 a program started because the United States' reluctancy to share technology with Turkey. 230mm rocket is continuation of SAGE 227 rocket program and 260mm rocket is based on 262mm Orkan M-87 rockets.

The 230 mm calibre system consists of six TOROS-230 unguided medium range rockets in a disposable launcher pod. The 260 mm calibre system consists of four TOROS-260 rockets in a disposable launcher pod. The launcher vehicle is designed to accept two TOROS-230 or TOROS-260 launcher pods.

Both rockets use an HTPB/AP solid propellent, and are stabilised in flight by four wrap-around fins. Sabots are fitted to the front of the rocket which fall away shortly after launch. Both rockets use a fin detent system to reduce wind dispersion, and are reported as having a dispersion of between one and two percent of their range. A variety of warheads have been proposed for the system including the basic blast fragmentation warhead, an electronic warfare warhead and a bunker busting warhead.

The launcher pods and advanced fire control system enable fast supply, loading, unloading, positioning and orientation operations. The unloading and reloading operations for two launch pods can be completed in less than twelve minutes. The system can be moved into position, oriented to target, and fired, all without the crew leaving the armoured cab. The launcher has a crew of three, but can be operated by a single person if needed.

Dispersion is reduced by helical rails which provide high roll rate during launch.

The system consists of four vehicles:
 Launcher vehicle 6×6
 Logistics vehicle 6×6
 Maintenance vehicle 6×6
 Fire Command-Control vehicle 4×4

Specifications

See also
M-87 Orkan - Yugoslavian multiple rocket launcher system.

References

 Jane's Armour and Artillery 2005-2006

External links
 TUBITAK-SAGE

Self-propelled rocket launchers
Self-propelled artillery of Turkey
230 mm artillery
260 mm artillery
Multiple rocket launchers